Hyppeln is a Swedish island in the archipelago of Gothenburg, part of Öckerö Municipality.

"Hyppeln" is also the name of the village on the island, which has about 150 permanent residents. There is a shop and a guest harbour on the island.

External links
Hyppelns IK

Islands of Västra Götaland County
Populated places in Västra Götaland County
Öckerö Municipality